Martin Nally (1882 – 1 August 1966) was an Irish politician and farmer. He was first elected to Dáil Éireann as a Cumann na nGaedheal Teachta Dála (TD) for the Mayo South constituency at the 1923 general election. He was re-elected at each subsequent election until lost his seat at the 1943 general election. From September 1933 on, he was elected as a Fine Gael TD.

References

1882 births
1966 deaths
Cumann na nGaedheal TDs
Fine Gael TDs
Members of the 4th Dáil
Members of the 5th Dáil
Members of the 6th Dáil
Members of the 7th Dáil
Members of the 8th Dáil
Members of the 9th Dáil
Members of the 10th Dáil
Politicians from County Mayo
Irish farmers